Silchar Medical College and Hospital (SMCH), established in 1968, is a government-run medical college cum hospital located in Silchar in southern Assam, one of the oldest medical college of North East India. It is the only referral hospital in the southern part of Assam, also referred to as the Barak Valley, and serves neighbouring states including Mizoram, North Tripura, West Manipur and South Meghalaya.

Inception and earlier years

Before Indian independence, people from Assam and other North Eastern states had to go to other states for medical education and advanced medical treatment. John Berry White, MRCS, a British surgeon of the East India Company, started health education and healthcare in Assam. He established the Berry White Medical School at Dibrugarh, Assam in 1898–99 with a donation of Rs. 50,000 — a large sum at the time. In course of time this medical school was upgraded and on 3 November 1947 the Assam Medical College, Dibrugarh was established and it stands as the first medical college in Assam.

While the other states had several medical colleges, Assam remained with only one. The state government in 1959, headed by the Chief Minister of Assam, B. P. Chaliha, Finance Minister Fakaruddin Ali Ahmed, and Health Minister Rupram Brahma decided to have a second medical college in Assam.

On 7 November 1959, the state government set up an expert committee to look into the matter and submit their report. The committee members visited parts of the state, held consultations with the public, and ultimately recommended Gauhati (now Guwahati) which is the gateway of Assam, as the most suitable location. The committee also recommended a third medical college in the Barak valley at Silchar, and a fourth at Tezpur on the north bank of Brahmaputra river. The Gauhati Medical College at Guwahati and the Silchar Medical College at Ghungoor, Silchar were set up.

The Silchar Medical College was inaugurated at its permanent campus on 15 August 1968. The admission to the MBBS course was 50 students annually. Prof. Rudra Goswami took charge as the first principal of the Silchar Medical College on 1 August 1968.

The professional courses started in the Boys’ Hostel No-II in a makeshift manner and the Civil Hospital, Silchar was taken over as its hospital in 1971. In 1977-78 the main hospital building complex was commissioned.

In 1985 postgraduate courses were introduced in five clinical subjects:
General Medicine
General Surgery
Obstetrics & Gynaecology
Ophthalmology
Otorhinolaryngology

The annual admission capacity in MBBS course was raised from 50 to 65 students in the same year.

The Medical Council of India (MCI) recognized the MBBS degree in 1976.

2008 saw introduction of PG courses in four more subjects: Radiology, Pathology, Anaesthesiology and Orthopaedics. At the same time government of Assam decided to increase the undergraduate seats from 65 to 100.

SMC at a glance

Courses
Graduate education
 Degree awarded: M.B.B.S.
 Duration of the course: Five and a half years including one-year internship.

Postgraduate education
 Courses: Degree (M.D. and M.S.) for three years; Diploma for two years.

Other courses
 Diploma Courses in Pharmacy
 GNM Course in Nursing
 Laboratory Technician Course
 Radiography Training
 B.Sc Nursing course

Departments
 Anatomy
 Physiology
 Biochemistry
 Pharmacology
 Pathology
 Microbiology
 Forensic and State Medicine
 Community Medicine
 Medicine
 Surgery (which includes Orthopedics)
 Pediatrics
 Obstetrics and Gynaecology
 Ophthalmology
 Otorhinolaryngology

University of Affiliation:
Assam University, Silchar
Srimanta Sankaradeva University of Health Sciences from 2010

Postgraduate education
The method of selection is entrance tests conducted by All India and state level selection bodies. Duration of postgraduate course: Degree three years; Diploma two years. For postgraduate (Degree) studies a thesis is compulsory.

Postgraduate Courses available are given below:
ENT
Medicine
Obstetrics & Gynaec.
Ophthalmology
Psychiatry
Surgery
Radio-diagnosis
Anaesthesiology
Pathology
Orthopaedics
Anatomy
Physiology
Bio-Chemistry
Microbiology
Pharmacology
Forensic & SM
Paediatrics
Dermatology

SMC Students' Union
The Silchar Medical College Students Union was formed, holding annual elections to an Executive Committee.

Photo gallery

References

External links
 Best hospital in Silchar

Affiliates of Srimanta Sankaradeva University of Health Sciences
Teaching hospitals in India
Medical colleges in Assam
Hospitals established in 1968
Silchar
1968 establishments in Assam
Colleges in Assam